George Blaha (born March 26, 1945) is an American broadcaster. He has been the radio and television play-by-play voice of the Detroit Pistons since the 1976–77 NBA season. He currently is the lead play-by-play man on Bally Sports Detroit, but does radio play-by-play instead during nationally televised games in place of the Pistons' regular radio play-by-play man Mark Champion. He is also the play-by-play voice of the Michigan State Spartans football team.

Early life
Blaha was born in Detroit, and grew up in Marshalltown, Iowa before moving to Grayling, Michigan at age thirteen. He earned a bachelor's degree in economics from the University of Notre Dame in 1966 and an MBA from the University of Michigan.

Career

Before the 1976–1977 season, Blaha succeeded Don Howe on WJR's radio broadcast of the Pistons, and announced his first NBA game from Cobo Arena on October 23, 1976, teaming with Tom Hemingway. Blaha has missed only three games since 1976 due to illness. He has had a variety of color analysts including former Detroit Pistons players John Mengelt, Dave Bing, Vinnie Johnson, Kelly Tripucka, Bill Laimbeer, Rick Mahorn, and current partner Greg Kelser. 

George Blaha has coined several iconic phrases to describe the action on the court including: "from behind the long line" or "the long gun" to describe a 3-point shot, and his signature call "count that baby and a foul" for a Piston's basket made whilst the shooter is fouled. 

He has almost always used the Pistons' first names when describing the action on the court. He also uses players' nicknames often, such as members of the 1988-1989 and 1989-1990 'Bad Boys' teams: "The Worm" for Dennis Rodman and "The Microwave" for Vinnie Johnson, or for Pistons players: "Rip" for Richard Hamilton, "Dunking Darvin" for Darvin Ham and "Big Ben" for Ben Wallace. He also often introduces his TV partner Greg Kelser as "Special K", his nickname when he was a player.  In 2002, Blaha was the recipient of the prestigious Ty Tyson Award for Excellence in Sports Broadcasting, awarded by the Detroit Sports Broadcasters Association.  In 2008, Blaha was elected to the Michigan Sports Hall of Fame and was inducted on Sept. 13, 2010, in Novi.

In addition to Pistons games, Blaha is the radio voice of the Michigan State Spartans football team. He was the voice of Michigan State Spartans men's basketball during the 2000-2001 season. He also does Detroit area TV and radio commercials for several companies. Blaha is an active member of the Detroit Sports Broadcasters Association, founded in 1948 by pioneer Detroit Tigers announcer Ty Tyson.

Personal life
Blaha lives in Troy, Michigan with his wife Mary.

References 

1945 births
Living people
College basketball announcers in the United States
College football announcers
National Basketball Association broadcasters
Radio personalities from Detroit
Television personalities from Detroit
University of Notre Dame alumni
Detroit Pistons announcers
People from Marshalltown, Iowa
Ross School of Business alumni
People from Grayling, Michigan